Capo Mele Lighthouse is an active lighthouse in northwestern Italy. It is located on Capo Mele, on the border of the comunes of Andora (to the west) and Laigueglia (to the northeast) in the Province of Savona in Liguria.

History 
The lighthouse was constructed by the Civil Engineers and completed in 1856. Its architecture was not changed from the original for almost half a century, and was repainted from yellow to red.  A petroleum lamp was installed in 1909, later with acetylene until 1936.  Like many other lighthouses in Italy, this lighthouse was severely damaged during World War II, and the extensive damage was repaired between 1947 and 1948.  In 1949 it was electrified.

Description
The lighthouse is a circular 25 metres high masonry tower and the diameter of the lantern is 3.82 metres. It is reached by a staircase of 74 steps. Adjacent to the tower is a three-story brick building.

The lighthouse is still manned and is managed by the Command Area Lighthouses Navy based in La Spezia (which incidentally takes care of all the lighthouses in the Tyrrhenian). The Marina Militare is responsible for managing all the lights on an approximate 8000 kilometers of Italian coastline since 1910, using both military and civilian technicians.

See also
 List of lighthouses in Italy

References

External links

 Servizio Fari Marina Militare 

Lighthouses in Italy
Buildings and structures in the Province of Savona
Lighthouses completed in 1856
1856 establishments in Italy